The 2009 Conference Premier play-off Final, known as the 2009 Blue Square Premier play-off Final for sponsorship purposes, was a football match between Cambridge United and Torquay United on 17 May 2009 at Wembley Stadium in London. It was the seventh Conference Premier play-off Final and the third to be played at Wembley Stadium.

Torquay won the match 2–0 to secure promotion to League Two, thus returning to The Football League after a two-year absence. Following their victory, Torquay United announced an open-top bus parade which took place on Thursday 21 May.

Match

Details

References

Play-off Final 2009
2009
Play-off Final 2009
Play-off Final 2009
Conference Premier play-off Final
National League play-off final
Events at Wembley Stadium